Pitigliano  is a town in the province of Grosseto, located about  south-east of the city of Grosseto, Tuscany, Italy.

The quaint old town is known as the little Jerusalem, for the historical presence of a Jewish community that has always been well integrated into the social context and that has its own synagogue.

History
Pitigliano and its area were inhabited in Etruscan times but the first extant written mention of it dates only to 1061. In the early 13th century it belonged to the Aldobrandeschi family and by the middle of the century it had become the capital of the surrounding county.

In 1293 the county passed to the Orsini family, signalling the start of 150 years of on-again/off-again wars with Siena, at the end of which, in 1455, a compromise of sorts was reached: Siena acknowledged the status of county to Pitigliano, which in exchange placed herself under the sovereignty of Siena. 

From then onwards the history of Pitigliano resorbs into the gradually wider ambit first of the Grand Duchy of Tuscany (1562) then of the united Kingdom of Italy.

Climate  
The municipality area of Pitigliano, while presenting different local situations on the basis of 'topography is characterized by rather low winter temperatures, which can occur during prolonged periods, despite the daily maximum values are often pleasing. On the contrary, in summer the heat can be very intense, though usually accompanied by low Relative humidity.

Consequently, the town has been classified in zone E with a sum of 2195 degree days, allowing the power of heating between October 15 and April 15, up to a maximum of 14 hours per day.

 Climate classification: E Zone, 2195 GG
 Atmospheric diffusion: high, Ibimet CNR 2002

Population

Synagogue and Jewish community
For several hundred years Pitigliano was a frontier town between the Grand Duchy of Tuscany and, to the south, the Papal States. For this reason, the town was home to a flourishing and long-lived Jewish community, mostly made up by people fleeing from Rome during the Counterreformation persecutions. Jews of the town used one of the caves for their ritual Passover matzoh bakery, the "forno delle azzime" described in detail in Edda Servi Machlin's "Classic Cuisine of the Italian Jews."   After the promulgation of racial laws under Nazi influence, all the Jews of the town reportedly escaped capture with the help of their Christian neighbors. Although there are almost no Jews left in town, not enough to provide a minyan, the synagogue (1598, with furnishings of the 17th and 18th centuries) is still officiated from time to time. It was restored in 1995.

Main sights

Etruscan remains
At the bottom of these cuts (Italian: tagliate) are carved channels, apparently for water, although some take the form of steps. The purpose of the cuts is not known: the three main theories are that they were roads, quarries, or water conveyance schemes; they radiate outward from the base of the butte of Pitigliano, down to the rivers then back to the top of the plateau that surrounds the town. A few very brief Etruscan inscriptions are said to have been found on the walls of the cuts, but are ill documented.

Medieval and Renaissance structures

The Cathedral of Santi Pietro e Paolo, Pitigliano.
The church of Santa Maria.
The Orsini Fortress, which achieved its present state in 1545 but represents a reworking of the earlier medieval fortress
the town's walls and gates, the best preserved of which is the Porta Sovana.
remains of a tall and very visible aqueduct at the very top of the butte.

Tempietto
The Tempietto ("Small temple") is a small cave, probably of natural origin but considerably reworked by human hands, lying a few hundred meters outside the central district, yet far above the Lente valley. Its purpose and builders remain unknown. Locally it is referred to as a "paleochristian tempietto", but this has never been confirmed; it must date to Late Antiquity or the early Middle Ages, although it may replace an Etruscan or Roman arcosolium.

Notable people 
 Umberto Baldini, art historian
 Giuseppe Bennati, director and screenwriter 
 Alberto Manzi, teacher, writer and television presenter  
 Niccolò di Pitigliano, noble leader
 Francesco Zuccarelli, painter of the 18th century

See also 
Orsini family
Sorano
Sovana
Roman Catholic Diocese of Pitigliano-Sovana-Orbetello

References

External links

Official website
Peter Petri's site
Thayer's Gazetteer of Italy
Tuscan Villas
The Tuff Jewel in the Tuscan Maremma
Photo gallery made by a UNESCO photographer

Hilltowns in Tuscany
Wine regions of Italy
Italian Jewish communities
Etruscan cities
Historic Jewish communities